Kheyr ol Din (also Romanized as Kheyr ol Dīn, Kheyr od Dīn, Kheiroddin, and Kheyr ad Dīn; also known as Kheyradyn and Kheīradim) is a village in Ozomdel-e Jonubi Rural District, in the Central District of Varzaqan County, East Azerbaijan Province, Iran. At the 2006 census, its population was 86, in 17 families.

References 

Towns and villages in Varzaqan County